Bologo is a town in the Siglé Department of Boulkiemdé Province in central western Burkina Faso. It has a population of 6,029.

References

Populated places in Boulkiemdé Province